Basilodes pepita, the gold moth, is a owlet moth in the family Noctuidae. The species was first described by Achille Guenée in 1852. It is found in North America.

The MONA or Hodges number for Basilodes pepita is 9781.

References

Further reading

 
 
 
 
 
 
 
 
 

Amphipyrinae
Articles created by Qbugbot
Moths described in 1852